Anton Suurkonka (12 August 1886, Valkeala - 31 March 1964) was a Finnish farmer, business executive, lay preacher and politician. He was a member of the Parliament of Finland from 1930 to 1936, from 1939 to 1945 and again from 1948 to 1951, representing the Agrarian League.

References

1886 births
1964 deaths
People from Valkeala
People from Viipuri Province (Grand Duchy of Finland)
Finnish Lutherans
Centre Party (Finland) politicians
Members of the Parliament of Finland (1930–33)
Members of the Parliament of Finland (1933–36)
Members of the Parliament of Finland (1939–45)
Members of the Parliament of Finland (1948–51)
Finnish people of World War II
20th-century Lutherans